Carlos Ariel Recalde González (born 14 December 1983), is a Paraguayan footballer playing for Club Olimpo of Argentine Football Association Primera B Nacional. He is a left sided midfielder who is dangerous from free kicks and crosses into the box.

He previously played for Sol de América and Guaraní of the Paraguayan league where he scored 16 goals in 82 games.

External links
 Carlos Recalde – Argentine Primera statistics at Fútbol XXI 
 Carlos Recalde at BDFA.com.ar 

1983 births
Living people
Paraguayan footballers
Club Sol de América footballers
Club Guaraní players
San Martín de San Juan footballers
Expatriate footballers in Argentina
Expatriate footballers in Ecuador
Paraguayan expatriate footballers
Argentinos Juniors footballers
Boca Unidos footballers
Olimpo footballers
Argentine Primera División players
People from Ñemby
Association football wingers
Deportivo Capiatá managers
Deportivo Santaní managers